This list of the oldest companies in the world includes brands and companies, excluding associations and educational, government, or religious organizations. To be listed, a brand or company name must remain operating, either in whole or in part, since inception. Note however that such claims are often open to question and should be researched further before citing them.

Statistics
According to a report published by the Bank of Korea in 2008 that looked at 41 countries, there were 5,586 companies older than 200 years. Of these, 3,146 (56%) are in Japan, 837 (15%) in Germany, 222 (4%) in the Netherlands, and 196 (3%) in France. Of the companies with more than 100 years of history, most of them (89%) employ fewer than 300 people.

A nationwide Japanese survey counted more than 21,000 companies older than 100 years as of September 30, 2009.

Founded before 1300

1300 to 1399

1400 to 1499

1500 to 1599

1600 to 1649

1650 to 1699

See also

 Companies by year of establishment (category)
 List of oldest banks in continuous operation
 List of oldest companies in Australia
 List of oldest companies in India
 List of oldest companies in the United States
 List of oldest institutions in continuous operation
 Henokiens
 Lindy effect

References

Oldest
Economy-related lists of superlatives
Oldest things